Laurent Bel (born 25 January 1966) is a French fencer. He competed in the individual and team foil events at the 1988 Summer Olympics.

References

External links
 

1966 births
Living people
French male foil fencers
Olympic fencers of France
Fencers at the 1988 Summer Olympics
Sportspeople from Neuilly-sur-Seine